is a private junior college in Takizawa, Iwate, Japan. Originally established in 1990 as a women's junior college, it became coeducational in 2000.

Curriculum
Department of Nursing
Department of Community Health Nursing
Department of Midwifery

External links
 Official website 

Japanese junior colleges
Educational institutions established in 1990
Private universities and colleges in Japan
Universities and colleges in Iwate Prefecture
Nursing schools in Japan
Takizawa, Iwate
1990 establishments in Japan